Parliamentary elections were held in Norway on 7 October 1957. The result was a victory for the Labour Party, which won 78 of the 150 seats in the Storting. As a result, the Gerhardsen government continued in office. 

This was the last time a single party won a majority of seats on its own in a Norwegian election.

Results

Seat distribution

Notes

References

General elections in Norway
1950s elections in Norway
Norway
Parliamentary
Norway